Benjamin Hill (born July 2, 1916) is an American former Negro league third baseman who played in the 1930s and 1940s.

A native of Savannah, Georgia, Hill made his Negro leagues debut in 1939 with the Toledo Crawfords. He went on to play for the Philadelphia Stars in 1943.

References

External links
 and Seamheads

1916 births
Philadelphia Stars players
Toledo Crawfords players
Baseball third basemen
Baseball players from Savannah, Georgia
Possibly living people